Saint Michael Catholic High School may refer to:

 St. Michael Catholic High School (Alabama), United States
 Saint Michael Catholic High School (Niagara Falls, Ontario), United States